The National Human Rights Commission (NHRC) of Bangladesh is an autonomous public body.

History 
National Human Rights Commission was established on 9 December 2007 by the Caretaker government of Bangladesh. The organization was constituted under the provisions of the National Human Rights Commission Ordinance. It was reestablished by the National Human Rights Commission Act, 2009 after the original ordinance lapsed.
Then it was reconstituted in 2009 as a national advocacy institution for human rights promotion and protection. It is committed to the accomplishment of human rights in a broader sense, including dignity, worth and freedom of every human being, as enshrined in the Constitution of the People's Republic of Bangladesh and different international human rights conventions and treaties to which Bangladesh is a signatory.

Organization
A Selection Committee is formed consisting of seven members under headed by Speaker of the Parliament. Based upon its recommendation the President of Bangladesh appoints the chairman and members of the commission.

Activities
It lodged complaints against Border Security Forces of India over Felani Killing with the National Human Rights Commission of India.
It holds surveys regarding perceptions about human rights in Bangladesh.
It campaigns against Human Rights abuses and extrajudicial killings in Bangladesh.

References

Government agencies of Bangladesh
Government commissions of Bangladesh